William San (born 01 October 1976) is a Malaysian actor, radio deejay and host.

San started out his acting and hosting before going into radio deejay. He has acted in several Singapore-Malaysia co-productions and was nominated for the Best Supporting Actor Award at the 2010 Golden Awards for his role in Lion.Hearts.

References

External links
 William San Facebook Official Page
 William San Sina Official Weibo 
 William San Official Blog
William San Profile on xin.msn.com entertainment 
 William San one FM Deejay Official Page

1975 births
Living people
Malaysian male actors